Tyrrellspass Castle, dating back to circa 1411, is situated in the town of Tyrrellspass, County Westmeath, Ireland. It is the only remaining castle of the Tyrrells, who came to Ireland around the time of the Norman Invasion.

Architecture 
The castle is approx. 20 metres high and follows the general pattern of tower houses, stone built, essentially defensive and comprising a series of superimposed chambers. The original spiral staircase and one of the original roof beams dating from 1280 can still be seen today, this exposed beam is present in a part of the restaurant known as the 'lounge,'Alongside the entrance door is a Murder-hole through which intruders could be attacked.

History 
Tyrrellspass is the modern name for Fartullagh, where in 1597 Captain Richard Tyrrell, a chief ally of Aodh Mór Ó Néill in the Nine Years' War, won a major victory against English crown forces in what has become known as the Battle of Tyrrellspass.

During the Cromwellian invasion of 1650, it is said the castle occupants suffered a great deal and many were executed. The castle and surrounding land was acquired soon after by the Rochfort family, who became the Earls of Belvedere. In 1796 the 2nd earl leased the castle to the army as a barracks. In 1850, ownership passed to Charles Brinsley Marlay, grandson of the 1st earl's only daughter, after whom it passed to Lieut.-Colonel Charles Howard-Bury, the explorer. He sold off the houses on the estate.

After a tumultuous history of intrusion, the castle was extensively restored by Phillip Ginnell in the 1970s.

Today
During the early 1990s, the building was converted into a modern restaurant. Today it operates under the name Tyrrellspass Castle Restaurant. It also hosts medieval banquets.

References

External links
 Tyrrellspass Castle - official site
 Westmeath Tourism 
 VirtualTourist.com/travel/Europe/Ireland/County_Westmeath/Tyrrellspass/Things_To_Do

Buildings and structures in County Westmeath
Castles in County Westmeath
Restaurants in the Republic of Ireland